Chromosome 5 is one of the 23 pairs of chromosomes in humans. People normally have two copies of this chromosome. Chromosome 5 spans about 182 million base pairs (the building blocks of DNA) and represents almost 6% of the total DNA in cells. Chromosome 5 is the 5th largest human chromosome, yet has one of the lowest gene densities.   This is partially explained by numerous gene-poor regions that display a remarkable degree of non-coding and syntenic conservation with non-mammalian vertebrates, suggesting they are functionally constrained.

Because chromosome 5 is responsible for many forms of growth and development (cell divisions) changes may cause cancers. One example would be acute myeloid leukemia (AML).

Genes

Number of genes 
The following are some of the gene count estimates of human chromosome 5. Because researchers use different approaches to genome annotation their predictions of the number of genes on each chromosome varies (for technical details, see gene prediction). Among various projects, the collaborative consensus coding sequence project (CCDS) takes an extremely conservative strategy. So CCDS's gene number prediction represents a lower bound on the total number of human protein-coding genes.

Gene list 

The following is a partial list of genes on human chromosome 5. For complete list, see the link in the infobox on the right.

Diseases and disorders
The following are some of the diseases related to genes located on chromosome 5:

 Achondrogenesis type 1B
 Atelosteogenesis, type II
 Bosch-Boonstra-Schaaf optic atrophy syndrome
 Charcot–Marie–Tooth disease, type 4
 Cockayne syndrome
 Cornelia de Lange syndrome
 Corneal dystrophy of Bowman layer
 Cri du chat
 Diastrophic dysplasia
 Ehlers-Danlos syndrome
 Familial adenomatous polyposis
 Granular corneal dystrophy type I
 Granular corneal dystrophy type II
 GM2-gangliosidosis, AB variant
 Homocystinuria
 3-Methylcrotonyl-CoA carboxylase deficiency
 Myelodysplastic syndrome
 Netherton syndrome
 Nicotine dependency
 Parkinson's disease
 Primary carnitine deficiency
 Recessive multiple epiphyseal dysplasia
 Sandhoff disease
 Spinal muscular atrophy
 Sotos Syndrome
 Survival motor neuron spinal muscular atrophy
 Treacher Collins syndrome
 Tricho-hepato-enteric syndrome
 Usher syndrome

Chromosomal conditions
The following conditions are caused by changes in the structure or number of copies of chromosome 5:
 Cri-du-chat syndrome is caused by a deletion of the end of the short (p) arm of chromosome 5. This chromosomal change is written as 5p-. The signs and symptoms of cri-du-chat syndrome are probably related to the loss of multiple genes in this region. Researchers have not identified all of these genes or determined how their loss leads to the features of the disorder. They have discovered, however, that a larger deletion tends to result in more severe mental retardation and developmental delays in people with cri-du-chat syndrome.

Researchers have defined narrow regions of the short arm of chromosome 5 that are associated with particular features of cri-du-chat syndrome. A specific region designated 5p15.3 is associated with a cat-like cry, and a nearby region called 5p15.2 is associated with mental retardation, small head (microcephaly), and distinctive facial features.
 Familial Adenomatous Polyposis is caused by a deletion of the APC tumor suppressor gene on the long (q) arm of chromosome 5. This chromosomal change results in thousands of colonic polyps which gives the patient a 100% risk of colon cancer if total colectomy is not done.
 Chromosome 5q deletion syndrome is caused by the deletion of the q arm (long arm) of chromosome 5. This deletion has been linked to several blood related disorders including Myelodysplastic syndrome and Erythroblastopenia. This is a different condition than Cri-du-chat which was mentioned above.
 Other changes in the number or structure of chromosome 5 can have a variety of effects, including delayed growth and development, distinctive facial features, birth defects, and other medical problems. Changes to chromosome 5 include an extra segment of the short (p) or long (q) arm of the chromosome in each cell (partial trisomy 5p or 5q), a missing segment of the long arm of the chromosome in each cell (partial monosomy 5q), and a circular structure called ring chromosome 5. A ring chromosome occurs when both ends of a broken chromosome are reunited.

Cytogenetic band

References

Further reading

External links

 
 

Chromosomes (human)